Powerpaste is a magnesium- and hydrogen-based fluid gel that releases hydrogen when it reacts with water. It was invented, patented and is being developed by Fraunhofer Institute for Manufacturing Technology and Advanced Materials (IFAM) of the Fraunhofer-Gesellschaft in Dresden, Germany.

An ester and a metal salt are then added to make the finished Powerpaste.

When Powerpaste reacts with water it produces hydrogen in a predictable manner for use in fuel cells. The molecular formula of magnesium hydride reacting with water is MgH2 + 2H2O → 2H2 + Mg(OH)2, so half of the produced hydrogen comes from the Powerpaste and half from the water. Magnesium hydroxide (Mg(OH)2) is a residue by-product created by this process.

Fraunhofer claims that Powerpaste is able to store hydrogen energy at 10 times the energy density of a lithium battery of a similar dimension and substantially more than compressed hydrogen at 700 bar and is safe and convenient for automotive situations.

Fraunhofer states that they are building a production plant slated to start production in 2021, which will produce 4 tons of Powerpaste annually. Fraunhofer has patented their invention in the United States and EU.

See also 
 Solar hydrogen panel, a device for producing photohydrogen
 Biohydrogen
 Hydrogen infrastructure
 Timeline of hydrogen technologies
 Liquid hydrogen
 Compressed hydrogen
 Hydrogen vehicle
 Fuel cell vehicle
 Hydrogen internal combustion engine vehicle
 Hydrogen-powered aircraft

External links 
 Fraunhofer Institute for Manufacturing Technology and Advanced Materials IFAM website

References 

Fuels
Hydrogen technologies
Hydrogen economy
Hydrogen storage
Hydrogen
Magnesium
Fraunhofer Society